K-8 is the name of two separate state highways in Kansas, United States. The southern highway is a  road, linking Oklahoma State Highway 8 (SH-8) to the town of Kiowa. The northern highway is a  road, linking U.S. Route 36 (US-36) near Athol to Nebraska Highway 10 (N-10) near the town of Franklin.

Route description

Southern highway
Classified as a major collector road, the southern K-8 is a continuation of SH-8, linking northern Oklahoma to the town of Kiowa. Approximately halfway between the state line and the northern terminus, the highway crosses a single track originally belonging to the Atchison, Topeka and Santa Fe Railway, which is now part of BNSF Railway's Kansas Division.

Northern highway
The northern K-8, also classified as a major collector road, begins at an intersection with US-36 near Athol, traveling north through rural farmland in northern Smith County. The highway terminates at the Nebraska state line, where the roadway continues as N-10.

History
K-8 was constructed between 1918 and 1932, traveling south-north through the middle of the state. By 1940, the highways were truncated to their current segments. US-281 has replaced the former statewide K-8 as the primary link between Oklahoma and Nebraska. The northern section was renumbered as K-11. In 1959, K-11 was transferred back to K-8, and K-8 was on its current route.

Major intersections

Southern highway

Northern highway

References

008
Transportation in Smith County, Kansas
Transportation in Barber County, Kansas